Events from the year 1701 in Japan.

Incumbents
Monarch: Higashiyama

Events
 Forty-seven rōnin

Deaths
January 14 - Tokugawa Mitsukuni, daimyō (b. 1628)
April 21 - Asano Naganori (b. 1667)

 
1700s in Japan
Years of the 18th century in Japan